Lee Bong-ryun (born Lee Jeong-eun, February 7, 1981) is a South Korean actress. She has appeared in supporting roles in various films and television dramas, and worked as a stage and musical actress.

Early life
Lee Bong-ryun was born as Lee Jeong-eun on February 7, 1981, in Pohang, North Gyeongsang, where her father's workplace Pohang Steelworks is located, and lived there until age sixteen.
Due to boredom, Lee dropped out of high school in Pohang after a month. Lee moved to Daegu, where she enrolled to an academy for eight months and decided to took GED. Lee then enrolled in Daegu Arts University, majoring in photography at the age of 17 years old. Then she went to a graduate school in Seoul to pursue Master's Degree in Photography at Chung-Ang University. Lee finished graduate school in Seoul at the age of 24. Her stage name used to be Zhuge Bong-ryeon, originally used in photography exhibitions.

Career 
Around 2003, Lee saw a musical called 'Sing in the Rain'. She enjoyed Park Dong-ha's performance and applied for the musical department in social education center in a university near her home. She attended night class for about two years. Her instructor, stage director Kim Dong-yeon, asked her to help as an assistant director for his play Fantasy Fairy Tale.

In 2005, she made her acting debut in the musical Five Drawings of Love. She was initially an understudy, but took the stage when an actor was missing for a month. Since then, she has appeared in various plays and musicals.

After watching Lee Jung-eun's performance as grandmother in musical Laundry, in 2008, Lee auditioned for grandmother role for the following season. After winning the role, Lee performed in  musical Laundry for 3 years.

In 2012, Lee acted in a youth drama written and directed by Park Geun-hyung titled "Red Bus".

After that, she joined the theater company Alleyway, led by director Park Geun-hyung, and acted in various works such as "Ode to Youth", "Manchurian Front", and "Press Guide". In play "Ode to Youth", Lee acted as a waitress at a coffee shop with epilepsy.

In 2017, Lee joined musical "Heavy Metal Girls". Followed by appearance as Katya in Korean premiere of play "Valentine's Day", a representative work released in 2009 by the Golden Mask Award-winning artist Ivan Vymilfayev, at Jayu Small Theater until January 14, 2018.

In 2017 Lee signed exclusive contract with C-JeS Entertainment.

In December 2018, Creative Table Quartz confirmed the appearance of actors Kim Jin-soo and Lee Bong-ryun in the Korean premiere of one-man play Everything Shines on Me. The play is Duncan McMillan's original work, that was participating in various overseas festivals, including Edinburgh and Perth in Australia, starting with the 2013 Lurdle Fringe Festival. It has been evaluated by The Guardian as “no more praise to say.”

Film career 
Her cinematic debut was a minor role in film Late Blossom by Choo Chang-min in 2011. It was followed with another minor roles in Masquerade (2012), Confession of Murder (2012), A Matter of Interpretation (2015), Girl On the Edge (2015), Life is but an Empty (2015), Run Off (2016), and How to Break up with My Cat (2016).

In 2017, Lee appeared as receptionist in Okja, a 2017 action-adventure film directed by Bong Joon-ho. Director Bong is fans of theater troupe 'Alleyway'. Director Bong with his son came to see play Manchurian Front when Lee was performing. According to the assistant director in Okja, Bong remembered Lee from the play. After several meetings and conversations, she was cast.

She appeared in "A Taxi Driver" (Director Jang Hoon, 2017) as a full-term pregnant woman who got a free taxi from Kim Man-seop (Song Kang-ho), a grumpy citizen. She also appeared in "Burning" (Director Lee Chang-dong, 2018). It was the same older sister who told Jong-su (Yoo Ah-in), who was searching for the missing Haemi (Jeon Jong-seo), that "Hae-mi is a liar."

In 2022, Lee starred opposite Lee Han-seo in director Jang Seon-hee’s independent film Two Woman. The film depicted a chance encounter between little girl who delivers newspapers and a woman who puts up flyers to find her lost child. It was premiered at  the 48th Seoul Independent Film Festival (SIFF).

Baeksang 
Lee has been a frequent cast member in productions staged by the National Theater Company of Korea. In 2020, Lee was cast as Princess Hamlet in the gender-blind production of Shakespeare's Hamlet of the National Theater Company's 70th anniversary. For this role she won the 57th Baeksang Arts Awards for Best Actress in a Play.

Television 
In 2013 Lee begin to acted in television with minor role. Her first role was Na-jung's (acted by Go Ara) college friend in tvN drama Reply 1994. Even though her airtime is short, She left impression as a college student from Yeosu who was involved in "who has the best hometown quarel" agaist Hae-tae (played by Son Ho-jun) from Suncheon.

In 2015, she got her first supporting role Mi-ran in drama Songgot: The Piercer, a 2015 JTBC drama starring Ji Hyun-woo and Ahn Nae-sang, which was based on the webtoon Awl by Choi Kyu-seok, which is itself based on a true story that took place in 2007.

In 2017, Lee costarred in Yoo Je-won's Tomorrow, with You. She acted as Oh So-ri, Ma-rin's (played by Shin Min-a) best friend who runs piano academy. Then she costarred in drama While You Were Sleeping. On October 12, 2017, Lee signed an exclusive contract with C-JeS Entertainment.

In 2018, Lee played in drama Life on Mars. In 2019, Lee did two drama When the Devil Calls Your Name and Melting Me Softly. In 2020 Lee starred in When the Weather Is Fine. In the end of 2020 Lee acted as Park May in JTBC drama Run On.

In 2021, Lee worked again with director Yoo Je-won and Shin Min-a in rom-com television series Hometown Cha-Cha-Cha, as Yeo Hwa-jung, Gongjin’s native who worked as a seafood restaurant owner and served as Tong-jang (village chief). With her ex husband Jang Young-guk (played by In Gyo-jin), she co-parent their son Yi-jun. She is also the building owner of Hye-jin's dental clinic and house.

Followed by role Hwang Ma-jin in JTBC drama Only One Person. In November 2021, after the expiration of her contract with her former agency, Lee joined Shin Min-a's agency AM Entertainment.

In 2022, She acted as Deaconess Jung, Yo-hwan's church figure (acted by Hwang Jung-min) in Netflix Original Series Narco-Saints.

In 2023 Lee joined cast of Crash Course in Romance as Kim Young-joo, best friend of Nam Haeng-seon (acted by Jeon Do-yeon). She was praised for her acting that match Jeon.

Personal life 
Lee Bong-ryun married actor Lee Gyu-hee on March 11, 2019. They met as junior and senior in Alleyway Theater Company.

Filmography

Film

Television series

Web series

Stage

Musical

Theater

Awards

References

External links
 
 
  

1981 births
Living people
Chung-Ang University alumni
South Korean film actresses
South Korean musical theatre actresses
South Korean stage actresses
South Korean television actresses
21st-century South Korean actresses